Theophilus Jones (18 October 1758 – 15 January 1812) was a Welsh lawyer, known as a historian of Brecknockshire.

Life
Theophilus Jones was the son of Hugh Jones (d. 1799), vicar of Llangammarch and then Llywel, Brecknockshire, and a prebendary of the collegiate church of Brecon; and his wife, Elinor (d. 1786), daughter of the historian Theophilus Evans. For many years he practised as a solicitor in Brecon. The death of his father gave him an additional degree of financial security, and following his appointment as deputy-registrar of the archdeaconry of Brecon, he sold his business in 1808 to have time to write.

Jones married Mary Price in 1783. He died on 15 January 1812, and was buried in the church of Llangammarch; his widow died on 22 July 1828.

Works
Jones's History of the County of Brecknock was published in two volumes in Brecon in 1805 and 1809. It was reprinted in one volume in 1898; and in a considerably enlarged form in four volumes, edited by Joseph Bailey, 1st Baron Glanusk, in 1909 to 1930.

Jones also published antiquarian communications in magazines, two papers in the Cambrian Register in 1795 and 1796, and another in Archaeologia, journal of the Society of Antiquaries of London, in 1814. He planned to write a history of Radnorshire which, however, never materialised; and he began a translation of Ellis Wynne's romance Gweledigaethau y Bardd Cwsg (Visions of the Sleeping Bard).

References

Bibliography

 

Attribution

1758 births
1812 deaths
Welsh solicitors
Welsh antiquarians
18th-century antiquarians
19th-century antiquarians
18th-century Welsh historians
19th-century Welsh historians